The Durga Temple is a Hindu temple dedicated to Goddess Durga and located in Baideshwar village (near Kalapathara chowk) on the way to Banki of Cuttack District in Odisha, India.

Architecture

The temple has a Khakhara vimana of early Kalingan order during Bhaumakara rule. The survey has assigned the temple to 8th century AD. It is a living temple, enshrining an image of eight-armed Mahishamardini Durga. Mahisasuramardini Durga, Parvati, Aja-ekapada Bhairava and Ganesh images are found. Similar construction are found in Vaital Deula, and Varahi Deula, Chaurasi. The temple is built with Ochre colour sandstone is used for the temple and laterite for the compound wall.

References

External links
durga temple in Khakhara Deula
sculptures around the temple

Hindu temples in Cuttack
Durga temples
Archaeological monuments in Odisha